Toronto (City) v Ontario (Attorney General), 2021 SCC 34, is a landmark decision of the Supreme Court of Canada on freedom of expression and unwritten constitutional principles. By a 5–4 majority, the court held that the Government of Ontario's decision to reduce the size of the Toronto City Council in the middle of 2018 municipal election campaign did not violate either section 2(b) of the Canadian Charter of Rights and Freedoms or the unwritten principle of democracy. The court further held that unwritten constitutional principles could not serve as an independent basis to invalidate legislation.

Background

Constitutional law 
Section 92(8) of the Constitution Act, 1867, gives provinces exclusive jurisdiction over municipalities. Section 3 of the Canadian Charter of Rights and Freedoms guarantees Canadian citizens the right to vote in provincial and federal elections, but does not mention municipal elections. The parties challenging Ontario's decision centred their arguments on section 2(b) of the Charter, which guarantees "freedom of thought, belief, opinion and expression, including freedom of the press and other media of communication".

Ward reconfiguration 
Under the City of Toronto Act, 2006, the municipal government of Toronto reassessed the structure of the city's electoral districts, in a process formally titled the Toronto Ward Boundary Review. The review finished in November 2016. Following the review, the city created three new wards, increasing the total from 44 to 47.

Better Local Government Act 
The Better Local Government Act, 2018, was first proposed by Doug Ford, who came into power that June, on July 27, 2018, and came into force on August 14. The statute, also known as Bill 5, cut the size of Toronto City Council from 47 to 25 wards, increasing the average size of a ward from 61,000 to 110,000 people. The statute came into force while the 2018 Toronto municipal election was in progress: it had begun on May 1, 2018, and over 500 candidates had already declared their intention to run by the time the act came into force. The Ford government did not notify opposition parties or the city before passing the statute.

Ontario Superior Court of Justice 
The city of Toronto and several candidates in the municipal election challenged the statute before the Ontario Superior Court of Justice. They won at first instance: the court held on September 9, 2018, that the Better Local Government Act violated section 2(b) of the Charter.

Justice Edward P. Belobaba held that the statute was unconstitutional because (1) it came into force during the election, thereby violating the rights of candidates under s 2(b); and (2) by increasing the size of wards, it violated the electors''' right to effective representation. Effective representation is a concept defined by the Supreme Court of Canada in relation to section 3 of the Charter: it holds that electors are not constitutionally entitled to "equality of voting power", but rather to have "legislative assemblies effectively represent the diversity of our social mosaic".

Justice Belobaba's decision was appealed and stayed by the Court of Appeal pending disposition of the appeal. After his ruling, the Ford government initially stated that it would invoke the notwithstanding clause and re-pass legislation reducing the size of council; following the stay, however, this step proved unnecessary.

 Court of Appeal for Ontario 
On September 19, 2019, in a 3–2 decision, the Court of Appeal for Ontario held that the Ford government was permitted to reduce the size of Toronto's city council; the Supreme Court's decision affirmed this ruling. Justice Bradley W. Miller's majority judgment held that the Better Local Government Act did not contravene section 2(b) because that section, in his view, prohibits governments from preventing expression by individuals but does not guarantee any particular means of expressing oneself. Since the Ontario statute did not prevent candidates from expressing themselves, but simply changed the means by which they could express themselves, it did not present a constitutional problem.

Beginning in the 1980s, in decisions including Reference Re Secession of Quebec, the Supreme Court of Canada has recognized that the constitution of Canada includes unwritten principles in addition to its written text. As part of its decision in Toronto (City), the Court of Appeal further held that such unwritten constitutional principles could not serve as an independent basis to strike down legislation.

Justices James C. MacPherson and Ian Nordheimer dissented. They would have held that the Better Local Government Act, because it came into force during the election, disrupted the electoral process and thereby interfered with the rights of both candidates and voters under section 2(b).

 Supreme Court of Canada 
On October 1, 2021, by a 5–4 majority, the Supreme Court of Canada held that Ontario was permitted to reduce the size of Toronto City Council during the 2018 municipal election. The majority opinion, written by Justices Richard Wagner and Russell Brown, confirmed the court's prior holdings that freedom of expression under the Charter has both positive and negative dimensions, and that positive claims may be recognised in "exceptional and narrow" circumstances. The court held that the city's freedom of expression claim was best characterised as positive, it then proceeded apply the legal framework for positive 2(b) claims identified in Baier v. Alberta and determined that the council cut did not meet the high bar necessary to establish a positive breach under section 2(b).

Under the ruling, provinces may change the rules for municipal elections so long as such changes do not amount to "substantial interference" with free expression. In the majority's view, the Ontario statute did not prevent "meaningful expression", and was therefore consistent with section 2(b). The majority also held, affirming the Court of Appeal, that unwritten constitutional principles cannot invalidate legislation on their own. However, the majority noted that unwritten constitutional principles may be used to interpret the constitution of Canada or to develop legal doctrine about it.

The dissenting opinion, written by Justice Rosalie Abella, stated that the Better Local Government Act, because it was passed during the election, "breathed instability" into the election and thereby impinged on the freedom of expression. Justice Abella also rejected the majority's findings on the role of unwritten constitutional principles.

 Notes 

 Sources 
 
 
 

 External links 
 Toronto (City) v Ontario (Attorney General)'', 2021 SCC 34

2021 in Toronto
Canadian constitutional case law
Supreme Court of Canada cases